The women's 200 metre individual medley competition at the 2018 Mediterranean Games was held on 24 June 2018 at the Campclar Aquatic Center.

Records 
Prior to this competition, the existing world and Mediterranean Games records were as follows:

Results

Heats 
The heats were held at 09:42.

Final 
The final was held at 17:37.

References 

Women's 200 metre individual medley
2018 in women's swimming